Aneta Tejralová (born 4 January 1996) is a Czech ice hockey player and member of the Czech national team, currently playing in the Premier Hockey Federation (PHF) with the Boston Pride.

She represented the Czech Republic in the women's ice hockey tournament at the 2022 Winter Olympics in Beijing and at eight IIHF World Championships, competing in five tournaments at the Top Division level (2013, 2016, 2017, 2019, and 2021) and three tournaments at the Division I A level (2012, 2014, and 2015). She was recognized by the directorate as the Best Defenseman of the 2015 IIHF Women's World Championship Division I A tournament and was selected as a Top 3 Player on the Czech national team at the 2017 IIHF Women's World Championship (Top Division).

As a junior player, Tejralová participated in four IIHF World U18 Championships and was selected as a Top 3 Player for the Czech national team at the 2013 tournament.

References

External links
 
 

1996 births
Living people
Boston Pride players
Czech expatriate ice hockey people
Czech expatriate ice hockey players in Russia
Czech expatriate ice hockey players in the United States
Czech women's ice hockey defencemen
Ice hockey players at the 2022 Winter Olympics
Olympic ice hockey players of the Czech Republic
HC SKIF players
Ice hockey people from Prague